The University of Oñati (in Basque Oñatiko Unibertsitatea; in Spanish Universidad de Oñate), the official name being the University of the Holy Spirit (Sancti Spiritus), was a University founded in 1540 and located in the Basque town of Oñati in Spain. Until its closure in 1901, it was the only university in the Spanish Basque Country. Its building is now the home of the International Institute for the Sociology of Law.

History

Founded in 1540 by the Bishop of Avila, Rodrigo Sánchez Mercado under the authority of a bull of Pope Paul III, the University of the Holy Spirit was originally located in Hernani, but in 1548 moved to Oñati. The University specialised in theology, law, canon law, the arts and medicine and was strictly limited to Catholics until 1869, when it was opened to all. The institution closed in 1901. Since 1989, the building houses the International Institute for Sociology of Law (IISL).

Building
In 1931 the building was declared a National Historic Monument. It is one of the most remarkable Renaissance buildings of the Basque Country, and was built in the Plateresque style. Construction of the building began in 1543 by the master stonemason Domingo de la Carrera and the sculptor Pierre Picart.

References

External links

 Universidad del Sancti Spiritus
 Instituto Internacional de Sociología Jurídica

Buildings and structures in the Basque Country (autonomous community)
Educational institutions established in the 1540s
Education in the Basque Country (autonomous community)
Renaissance architecture in the Basque Country (autonomous community)
Defunct universities and colleges in Spain